The Ford Hunger March, sometimes called the Ford Massacre, was a demonstration on March 7, 1932 in the United States by unemployed auto workers in Detroit, Michigan, which took place during the height of the Great Depression. The march started in Detroit and ended in Dearborn, Michigan, in a confrontation in which four workers were shot to death by the Dearborn Police Department and security guards employed by the Ford Motor Company. More than 60 workers were injured, many by gunshot wounds. Three months later, a fifth worker died of his injuries.

The march was supported by the Unemployed Councils, a project of the Communist Party USA. It was an important part of a chain of events that resulted in the unionization of the U.S. auto industry.

Background 

In the 1920s, prosperity came to the Detroit area, because of the successes of the U.S. auto industry in that decade. Concentrated in the Detroit area, the industry produced 5,337,000 vehicles in 1929, as many individuals bought their first cars. The 1930 U.S. Census reported the U.S. population as 122,775,046 people. (As a point of reference, the U.S. auto industry produced 8,681,000 vehicles in 2008, and the U.S. population was estimated at 304,375,000 that year. Therefore, the U.S. auto industry was producing 50% more vehicles per capita in 1929 than in the early 21st century, when there is more competition from foreign auto makers.)

On Tuesday, October 29, 1929, the stock market crashed, leading to the Great Depression. Vehicle production in the country plummeted. In 1930, production declined to 3,363,000 vehicles. In 1931, production fell to 1,332,000 vehicles, only 25% of the production of two years before.

As a result, unemployment in Detroit skyrocketed, and the wages of those still working were slashed. In 1929, the average annual wage for auto workers was $1639. By 1931, it had fallen 54% to $757. By 1932, there were 400,000 unemployed in Michigan.

In 1927, there were 113 suicides in Detroit. That number increased to 568 in 1931. In that year, the welfare allowance was 15 cents per person per day. At the time, neither states nor the federal government provided unemployment insurance or Social Security. A wave of bank closures took the life savings of many unemployed workers and retirees, as every neighborhood bank in Detroit went out of business. The Federal Deposit Insurance Corporation, established by Congress to secure bank deposits and protect people's savings, had not yet been established. By 1932, foreclosures, evictions, repossessions and bankruptcies were commonplace, and the unemployed felt despair.

The Hunger March

The Detroit Unemployed Council and the Auto, Aircraft and Vehicle Workers of America called for a march on Monday, March 7, 1932, from Detroit to Dearborn to end at the Ford River Rouge Complex, the company's largest factory. The principal organizers of the march were Albert Goetz, a leader of the Detroit Unemployed Council, and John Schmies, the Communist candidate for mayor of Detroit. Detroit's sitting mayor at the time was Frank Murphy; his profile rose after the incident, eventually becoming Governor of Michigan and later appointed to the Supreme Court by Franklin D. Roosevelt as an Associate Justice. The Murphy administration decided to allow the march to proceed, although they did not grant a permit.

On March 6, William Z. Foster, secretary of the Trade Union Unity League and a leader of the Communist Party, gave a speech in Detroit in preparation for the march. The marchers intended to present 14 demands to Henry Ford, the head of the Ford Motor Company. Among these were demands to rehire the unemployed, provide funds for health care, end racial discrimination in hiring and promotions, provide winter fuel for the unemployed, abolish the use of company spies and private police against workers, and give workers the right to organize unions.

March 7 was bitterly cold. A crowd estimated at between 3,000 and 5,000 gathered near the Dearborn city limits, about a mile from the Ford plant. The Detroit Times called it "one of the coldest days of the winter, with a frigid gale whooping out of the northwest". Marchers carried banners reading "Give Us Work", "We Want Bread Not Crumbs", and "Tax the Rich and Feed the Poor". Albert Goetz gave a speech, asking that the marchers avoid violence. The march proceeded peacefully along the streets of Detroit until it reached the Dearborn city limits.

There, the Dearborn police attempted to stop the march by firing tear gas into the crowd and began hitting marchers with clubs. One officer fired a gun in the direction of the marchers. The unarmed crowd scattered into a field covered with stones, picked them up, and began throwing stones at the police. The angry marchers regrouped and advanced nearly a mile toward the plant. There, two fire engines began spraying cold water onto the marchers from an overpass. The police were joined by Ford security guards and began shooting into the crowd. Marchers Joe York, Coleman Leny and Joe DeBlasio were killed, and at least 22 others were wounded by gunfire.

The leaders decided to call off the march at that point and began an orderly retreat. Harry Bennett, head of Ford security, drove up in a car, opened a window, and fired a pistol into the crowd. Immediately, the car was pelted with rocks, and Bennett was injured. He got out of the car and continued firing at the retreating marchers. Dearborn police and Ford security men opened fire with machine guns on the retreating marchers. Joe Bussell, 16 years old, was killed, and dozens more men were wounded. Bennett was hospitalized for his injury.

About 25 Dearborn police officers were injured by thrown rocks and other debris; however, none were hit by gunfire.

Aftermath 

All of the seriously wounded marchers were arrested, and the police chained many to their hospital beds after they were admitted for treatment. A nationwide search was conducted for William Z. Foster, but he was not arrested. No law enforcement or Ford security officer was arrested, although all reliable reports showed that they had engaged in all the gunfire, resulting in deaths, injuries and property damage. The New York Times reported that "Dearborn streets were stained with blood, streets were littered with broken glass and the wreckage of bullet-riddled automobiles, and nearly every window in the Ford plant's employment building had been broken".

The following day, Detroit newspapers reported sensational and mistaken accounts of the violence, apparently based on rumors or false police reports. The Detroit Times, for example, falsely claimed that Harry Bennett and four policemen had been shot. The Detroit Press said that "six shots fired by a communist hiding behind a parked car were cited by police Monday night as the match which touched off a riot at the Ford Motor Company plant." The Detroit Free Press wrote that "These professional Communists alone are morally guilty of the assaults and killings which took place before the Ford plant." The Mirror ran a headline saying "Red Leaders Facing Murder Trials".

In the following days, the local newspapers gathered more information and changed their tone, reassigning blame for the deaths and severe injuries of unemployed and unarmed workers. The Detroit Times, for example, said that "Someone, it is now admitted, blundered in the handling of the throng of Hunger Marchers that sought to present petitions at the Ford plant in River Rouge." The newspaper continued that 'The killing of obscure workmen, innocent of crime" was "a blow directed at the very heart of American institutions." The Detroit News reported that "Insofar as the demonstration itself had leaders present in the march, they appear to have warned the participants against a fight."

The mainstream trade union movement spoke out against the killings. The Detroit Federation of Labor, affiliated with the American Federation of Labor, issued a statement saying that "The outrageous murdering of workers at the Ford Motor Plant in Dearborn on Monday has cast a stain on this community that will remain a disgrace for many years."

On March 12, at least 25,000 and perhaps as many as 60,000 people participated in a funeral procession for the four dead marchers, who were buried side by side in Woodmere Cemetery in Detroit. The slogan of the funeral march was "Smash the Ford-Murphy Terror".

Detroit Mayor Frank Murphy said that "the chaining of patient prisoners to beds is a brutal practice that should find no encouragement in an enlightened hospital". Murphy was criticized because some observers thought Detroit police may have been involved in the violence. But a historian writing nearly 50 years later described their role as "peripheral". Murphy denounced Harry Bennett as an "inhuman brute" and called Henry Ford a "terrible man". He asked, "What is the difference between the official Dearborn police and Ford's guards?" His answer was, "A legalistic one."

A fifth marcher, Curtis Williams, did not succumb to his injuries for three months. When Williams, an African American, died from his injuries, Woodmere Cemetery did not allow him to be buried there under its "whites only" policy of segregation. Curtis Williams' family arranged for his cremation, and his ashes were scattered in the area near the graves of his fellow marchers.

Nine years later, on April 11, 1941, after the economy had begun to recover and 40,000 Ford workers conducted a ten-day sit down strike, Henry Ford signed a collective bargaining agreement with the United Auto Workers union.

Grand Jury report 

Prosecutor Harry S. Toy convened a grand jury to investigate the violence. At the end of June, they completed their investigation and issued their report. They said "After hearing many witnesses on both sides of the matter, this grand jury finds no legal grounds for indictments. However, we find that the conduct of the demonstrators was ill-considered and unlawful in their utter disregard for constituted authority. We find, further, that the conduct of the Dearborn City Police when they first met the demonstrators, though well-intended, might have been more discreet, and better considered before they applied force in the form of tear gas. However, we believe that the said police discharged what they conscientiously considered to be their sworn duty as law enforcing officials, alike when they intercepted the rioters at the city's limit, using tear gas and in the critical and violent situation which ensued employing gunfire to protect life and property, which were then manifestly in danger."

One grand juror, a political ally of Frank Murphy, dissented, calling the administration of the grand jury "the most biased, prejudiced and ignorant proceeding imaginable". This grand juror, Mrs. Jerry Houghton Bacon, said that she "witnessed the most glaring discrimination on the parts of the prosecutors in the treatment of witnesses brought before the grand jury. Marked prejudice was voiced by the prosecutors which, without regard to its intent, impressed and influenced the minds of the jurors."

Documentation
Photographic evidence of the march and the funerals that followed can be found at the website of the Walter P. Reuther Library, Wayne State University.

Documentation of the march survives in a film by the Workers Film and Photo League of Detroit.

See also

Battle of the Overpass — at Rouge River Plant in 1937.
Unemployment in the United States
Murder of workers in labor disputes in the United States

References

Notes

Bibliography

External links
 Detroit Civil Rights Trilogy: Last Survivor of the Ford Hunger March
 Walter P. Reuther Library, Wayne State University

Protest marches
Police brutality in the United States
Labor disputes in Michigan
Labor disputes in the United States
Crimes in Michigan
Unemployment in the United States
History of labor relations in the United States
Great Depression in the United States
Protest-related deaths
1932 in Michigan
Michigan State Historic Sites in Wayne County, Michigan
Ford Motor Company labor relations
1932 labor disputes and strikes
Automobile culture and history in Dearborn, Michigan
History of Detroit